In graph theory, a degree-constrained spanning tree is a spanning tree where the maximum vertex degree is limited to a certain constant k. The degree-constrained spanning tree problem is to determine whether a particular graph has such a spanning tree for a particular k.

Formal definition

Input: n-node undirected graph G(V,E); positive integer k < n.

Question: Does G have a spanning tree in which no node has degree greater than k?

NP-completeness

This problem is NP-complete . This can be shown by a reduction from the Hamiltonian path problem. It remains NP-complete even if k is fixed to a value ≥ 2. If the problem is defined as the degree must be ≤ k, the k = 2 case of degree-confined spanning tree is the Hamiltonian path problem.

Degree-constrained minimum spanning tree
On a weighted graph, a Degree-constrained minimum spanning tree (DCMST) is a degree-constrained spanning tree in which the sum of its edges has the minimum possible sum. Finding a DCMST is an NP-Hard problem.

Heuristic algorithms that can solve the problem in polynomial time have been proposed, including Genetic and Ant-Based Algorithms.

Approximation Algorithm

References

 

Spanning tree
NP-complete problems